Vercors Massacre is a mass murder that occurred on December 15 or 16, 1995, at Vercors Massif near Saint-Pierre-de-Chérennes, France. Two members of the Order of the Solar Temple killed 14 members of the sect and themselves.

Massacre
On the night of December 15-16, 1995, at Vercors Massif near the village of Saint-Pierre-de-Chérennes, 16 members of the Order of the Solar Temple committed suicide. 14 people, including three children, took sedative pills, put plastic bags on their heads and lay in a circle, feet in the middle of the circle. Then Jean-Pierre Lardanchet and André Friedli shot each member in the head one by one with two .22 caliber rifles. Two women who were mothers of children had broken skulls. After that, they put firewood on the bodies, poured gasoline and set it on fire. Then they both shot themselves in the head with two .357 Magnum revolvers and swam into the flames. Their bodies were found on December 23, 1995. Their goal was the soul's journey to the Sirius.

References

External links
L'Ordre du Temple Solaire Report CICNS

Massacres in France
Deaths by firearm in France
Mass shootings in France
Murder–suicides in France
1995 murders in France
Mass suicides
Order of the Solar Temple
1995 mass shootings in Europe